Theodosius of Arles (or Théodose, Teudosi, Theodoric), was Archbishop of Arles .

Biography
Theodosius appears in the episcopal diptychs.
However, very little is known of his life.

He already governed the diocese of Arles when he participated on 12 August 632 in the funeral of Saint Resticula or Resticule, abbess of the Monastery of Saint John, Arles.
The Council of Chalon-sur-Saône (647–653) was attended by most of the bishops of Provence, as well as the metropolitans of Lyon, Vienne, Rouen, Sens, Bourges and Besançon.
Théodose was summoned but did not attend.
Theodosius was accused of several crimes and of misconduct.
He was suspended from all episcopal functions in 650.
According to H. Clair, Theodosius heard the council's decision condemning him as a heretic in his own cathedral.

According to some, Theodosius then went to Rome where he obtained pardon from Pope Vitalian (657–672) who sent him in penance to preach in England.

In a charter dated 664, reported by Scholastique Pitton in the Annals of the Church of Aix, it appears that Theodosius was still bishop of Arles at that date.
The date of 664, must be taken with caution because there are acts of his successor, Jean I of Arles, dated 658 and 659. 
But it is more confused. 
According to the historian Jean-Pierre Papon, a certain Theodore (and not Theodosius) crowned bishop of Canterbury by Pope Vitalian, would have been received by John I before his departure for England at the earliest around 657.
Was this Theodore the Theodosius sent to England for penance?

Notes

Sources

Archbishops of Arles
650 deaths